Niatross  (1977–1999) was an American champion standardbred race horse that many believe was the greatest harness horse of all time.

Background
The son of Albatross out of the mare Niagara Dream, Niatross was foaled on March 30, 1977. He was trained and driven by co-owner Clint Galbraith.

Racing career
In September 1979, after Niatross won his first six races, a half interest in him was sold to Stockbroker Lou Guida and the Niatross syndicate for $2.5 million. He was unbeaten in 13 starts in his  2-year-old season, when he was named Harness Horse of the Year. His earnings of $604,900 were a two-year-old record for either the Standardbred or Thoroughbred breed.

In 1980, Niatross won The Meadowlands Pace, which was the first million dollar race in either standardbred or thoroughbred racing history.
He also won the Triple Crown. In a time trial at The Red Mile in Lexington, Kentucky he beat the world record by three seconds, setting a mark of 1:49.1. In addition to his time trial he paced the fastest race miles on one mile (1.52.1) and half mile (1.54.4) tracks. The 1980 season brought Niatross 24 wins from 26 starts.

Early in the 1980 season Niatross won the Cane Pace before racing at the Saratoga Standardbred track in Saratoga, NY, where he spooked and fell over the inside hubrail and was defeated for the first time. 
In an elimination for the Meadowlands Pace, he broke stride, lost valuable ground, regained his gait and, in what Stanley Dancer described as the greatest performance he had seen, recovered and finished 4th, qualifying for the final. In the Meadowlands Pace final, Niatross went right to the front and never looked back, winning by 4 1/2 lengths from Storm Damage in 1.53.1 as the 2-5 favourite. He set a world record for his age and was only 1/5 of a second outside of the overall world record. Trainer Clint Galbraith described the race as being more important than any race in Niatross' career.
Niatross went on to beat all of his competition easily in future starts, frequently setting track records, including a new race, track and Canadian record during the prestigious Prix d'Été at Blue Bonnets racetrack in Montreal, Quebec. He also won the Gaines Memorial at Vernon Downs, the Oliver Wendell Holmes Pace at the Meadowlands, the Dancer Memorial at Freehold and the American Classic at Hollywood Park.  In the Little Brown Jug Niatross recorded wins in straight heats of 1.55 and 1.54.4 setting six world records before a record Jug crowd of 45,621. He then won the Messenger Stakes to complete the Triple Crown. A December appearance at Pompano Park, his last career race, brought a crowd of more than 23,000.

Time Trial
Until 1980 the fastest mile recorded in harness racing was 1.52.0 by Steady Star. On October 1, 1980 Niatross time trialled at The Red Mile in Lexington, Kentucky with a previous best of 1.52.4 recorded at Syracuse earlier in the year. At The Red Mile Niatross reached the quarter mile in 27.3 almost one second faster than Steady Star's record and the half mile in 54.3 equal with Steady Star. Reaching the three quarter mile in 1.21.4, a 27.2 last quarter resulted in a mile of 1.49.1, the fastest ever by 2 4/5 seconds.

Stud career
By the time Niatross retired to stud at Castleton Farm, Kentucky, in 1981, he had earned more prize money than any other standardbred horse in history. He had been named Harness Horse of the Year in 1979 and 1980, the New York Post Athlete of the Year in 1980, and Harness Horse of the Decade for the 1980s. At stud, he commanded a top price for his services. Among his progeny were winners of the Little Brown Jug. One son, Nihilator, won Horse of the Year honors and his first two crops earned $8.6 million. Niatross was relocated to Pine Hollow Farm in New York in 1983 and to Saratoga Standardbred Farm in 1986 however he was not as successful in New York as he had been in Kentucky.

In 1996, when he was 19 years old, Niatross made a 20-city tour for his fans in Canada and the United States. In 1997, he was inducted as a member of the Living Horse Hall of Fame. In May 1999, he took ill and was transported to the University of Pennsylvania's New Bolton Center where he was diagnosed with a large cancerous mass in his abdomen. On June 7, 1999, Niatross was humanely euthanized. He was cremated with his remains interred at the Hall Of Fame Museum in Goshen, New York.

Pedigree

See also
 List of historical horses

References

See also
 Niatross wins the Little Brown Jug - YouTube

1977 racehorse births
1999 racehorse deaths
American Standardbred racehorses
American Champion harness horses
Harness Horse of the Year winners
United States Harness Racing Hall of Fame inductees
Canadian Horse Racing Hall of Fame inductees
Little Brown Jug winners
Cane Pace winners
Messenger Stakes winners
Triple Crown of Harness Racing winners
Horse racing track record setters